Good Morning, Magpie is an album by the indie rock band Murder By Death. It was released on April 6, 2010. It is their second release through Vagrant Records.

Track listing

Personnel
 Adam Turla – lead vocals, guitars, keyboards
 Sarah Balliet – cello
 Dagan Thogerson – drums, percussion
 Matt Armstrong – bass

References

2010 albums
Murder by Death (band) albums
Vagrant Records albums